Robert Shaw may refer to:

Academia and science
 Robert Shaw (physicist) (born 1946), American physicist
 Robert Sidey Shaw (1871–1953), president of the Michigan State College of Agriculture and Applied Science, 1928–1941

Arts and literature
 Robert Gottschall (1915–2005), American actor also known as Bob Shaw and Robert Shaw
 Robert Shaw (actor) (1927–1978), English actor
 Rob Shaw (filmmaker), American animator, and director of music videos, commercials, and short films
 Robert J. Shaw (1917–1996), American television writer
 Bob Shaw (1931–1996), Irish science fiction writer
 Robert Shaw (poet) (born 1933), British poet, jazz musician, and pioneer of poetry-and-jazz fusion
 Robert Shaw (blues musician) (1908–1985), American blues and boogie-woogie pianist
 Robert Shaw (conductor) (1916–1999), American conductor
 Bob Shaw (production designer), American production designer

Business
 Robert Gould Shaw II (1872–1930), wealthy Massachusetts landowner
 Robert Gould Shaw III (1898–1970), son of Robert Gould Shaw II
 Robert Shaw (business writer) (born 1950), business author and consultant on the field of marketing

Civil service
 Robert Shaw (judge) (1907–1972), United States federal judge
 Robert Fletcher Shaw (1910–2001), Canadian businessman, academic, and civil servant

Military
 Robert Gould Shaw (1837–1863), Union Army colonel during the American Civil War
 Robert Shaw (Royal Navy officer) (1900–1995), English Royal Navy officer and cricketer

Politics
 Robert Shaw (Canadian politician) (1845–1882), politician from Prince Edward Island, Canada
 Robert Shaw (Illinois politician) (born 1937), Illinois politician
 Robert Shaw (Ohio politician) (1904–1985), Ohio state senator, 1967–1972
 Robert L. Shaw (1865–1930), politician from Alberta, Canada
 Sir Robert Shaw, 1st Baronet (1774–1849), Member of Parliament

Sport
 Bob Shaw (end) (1921–2011), American NFL football player for the Chicago Cardinals
 Bob Shaw (wide receiver) (born 1947), American football wide receiver
 Bob Shaw (athlete) (born 1932), British Olympic hurdler
 Bob Shaw (baseball) (1933–2010), American baseball player
 Bob Shaw (golfer) (born 1944), Australian golfer
 Bob Shaw (footballer) (1870–?), Scottish footballer
 Robert Shaw (American football) (born 1956), American NFL football player for the Dallas Cowboys
 Robert Shaw (footballer) (born 1955), Australian rules footballer
 Robert Wilson Shaw (1913–1979), Scottish rugby union player
 Robert Shaw (wheelchair tennis) (born 1989), Canadian wheelchair tennis player

Other
 Robert Shaw (bishop) (died 1527), Scottish monk and prelate
 Robert Barkley Shaw (1839–1879), British explorer